Kahalgaon Assembly constituency is one of 243 legislative assemblies of Bihar. It is a part of the Bhagalpur lok sabha constituency along with other assembly constituencies: Gopalpur, Pirpainti, Bihpur, Bhagalpur and Nathnagar.

Overview
Kahalgaon comprises CD Blocks Goradih & Sonhoula; Gram Panchayats Parashathdih (Shankarpur Khawas), Kodwar, Janidih, Pakkisarai, Dhanora,
Maishamunda, Ekchari, Bholsar, Ogree, Shyampur & Nagar Panchayat Kahalgaon of Kahalgaon CD Block.

Members of Legislative Assembly

Election results

2020

2015

2010

See also
 List of Assembly constituencies of Bihar

References

External links
 

Politics of Bhagalpur district
Assembly constituencies of Bihar